Gymnobela carinaria is an extinct species of sea snail, a marine gastropod mollusk in the family Raphitomidae.

Description

Distribution
Fossils of this marine species were found in Tertiary strata from Motutara, West Coast, Auckland, New Zealand

References

 Maxwell, P.A. (2009). Cenozoic Mollusca. pp 232–254 in Gordon, D.P. (ed.) New Zealand inventory of biodiversity. Volume one. Kingdom Animalia: Radiata, Lophotrochozoa, Deuterostomia. Canterbury University Press, Christchurch

External links
 A.W.B. Powell, Tertiary Mollusca from Motutara, West Coast, Auckland; Records of the Auckland Institute and Museum, 1935

carinaria
Gastropods described in 1935
Gastropods of New Zealand